Adémaï au poteau-frontière , is a French comedy film from 1950, directed by Paul Colline, written by Paul Colline, and starring Colline as a peasant and featuring Louis de Funès as a soldier.

Synopsis 
The peasant Adémaï, returning home, gets lost in the forest and knocks down a border post. In his haste to replant it, he installs it upside down. The patrols of the two bordering - and antagonistic - countries replant the border post facing in a different direction each time they pass it. War becomes more and more likely as the border is repeatedly violated.

Cast 
 Paul Colline as Adémaï, the peasant
 Sophie Carral as the female smuggler
 Noël Roquevert
 Jean Richard
 Thérèse Aspar
 Louis de Funès : soldier (uncredited)
 Simone Duhart
 Alice Leitner
 Paul Barre
 Raymond Girard
 Max Revol
 Suzanne Grujon
 Jacques Mareuil
 Rivers Cadet
 Maurice Schutz
 René Lecuyer

References

External links 
 
 Adémaï au poteau-frontière (1950) at the Films de France

1950 films
French comedy films
1950s French-language films
French black-and-white films
1950 comedy films
1950s French films